Episyrphus viridaureus is a species of hoverfly. This hoverfly has orange yellow body with narrow dark bands at the abdomen. The upper side of the thorax covered with black metallic shield and the rest is covered with orange-yellow hair. Between the dark purple eyes is a metallic blue part at the forehead. Its size is up to 35 mm, typically 10–20 mm.

References

External links
 

Syrphini
Diptera of North America
Insects described in 1824
Taxa named by Christian Rudolph Wilhelm Wiedemann